Clearstone Venture Partners is an early stage venture capital firm focused on IT investing with offices in Santa Monica, CA, Palo Alto, CA, and Mumbai, India.  Founded in 1997, as Idealab Capital Partners, Clearstone is responsible for the early-stage funding of many successful startups including PayPal (IPO, acquired by eBay), Overture.com (IPO, acquired by Yahoo), Internet Brands/CarsDirect (NASDAQ: INET), NetZero/United Online (NASDAQ: UNTD), MP3.com (IPO, acquired by Vivendi), Meru Networks (NASDAQ: MERU), Integrien (acquired by VMware), Ankeena (acquired by Juniper), Kazeon Systems (Acquired by EMC) and Mimosa Systems (acquired by Iron Mountain).

Managing Directors 
Bill Elkus, Founder
Jim Armstrong
William Quigley
Sumant Mandal
Erik Lassila

References

External links 
Clearstone Venture Partners

Financial services companies established in 1997
Venture capital firms of the United States